Robert J. VerHeulen is a Republican politician from Michigan who served in the Michigan House of Representatives. Prior to his election to the House, VerHeulen served as the mayor of Walker, Michigan. He was also an attorney for Meijer and served on several community boards and organizations.

In November 2018, VerHeulen proposed a bill to limit the powers of an incoming Democratic administration in Michigan. In the 2018 elections, Democrats obtained the governor, secretary of state and attorney general posts; Democrats last held all three positions at the same time in 1990. The bill would give greater powers to the Michigan legislature, where the Republican Party holds a majority of seats. The bill would also shift oversight of the Michigan Campaign Finance Act away from the Secretary of State to a commission.

References

External links 
 Rob VerHeulen

Living people
Republican Party members of the Michigan House of Representatives
Mayors of places in Michigan
People from Kent County, Michigan
University of Michigan alumni
Wayne State University Law School alumni
21st-century American politicians
Year of birth missing (living people)